Metronomy are a British electronic music group formed in 1999. As of 2021, the band consists of Joseph Mount (vocals, keyboards and guitar), Oscar Cash (keyboards, backing vocals, guitar and saxophone), Anna Prior (drums and vocals), Olugbenga Adelekan (bass guitar and vocals) and Michael Lovett (keyboards and guitars). Their music consists of vocal and instrumental electronic pop music. Mount also releases remixes under the name Metronomy, and has remixed many artists including Gorillaz, Sebastien Tellier, Roots Manuva, Franz Ferdinand, Klaxons, Goldfrapp, Young Knives, Zero 7, Ladytron, Kate Nash, Lady Gaga and Lykke Li.

Metronomy have released seven albums of original material, Pip Paine (Pay The £5000 You Owe), Nights Out, The English Riviera, Love Letters, Summer 08, Metronomy Forever, and Small World.

Biography

As a teenager, Joseph Mount began Metronomy as a bedroom project while he was still living with his parents in Devon. After having an interest in music from an early age, he "drummed in a few bands at school and they all fell apart. Then I got an old computer off my dad and I started messing around when I was about sixteen or seventeen". The name Metronomy was originally chosen by Mount and was said to be influenced by the band names of Autechre and Funkstörung.

In 2002, Mount moved to Brighton for his studies, while having a number of odd jobs, including one at a local HMV. Upon graduating, he became interested in music production and began "soundtracking animations". During his time in Brighton, Mount began to get involved with electronic music nights and performed as a DJ. At one of these gigs he was approached by "some guy, [who] told me he'd put out a record. It turned out that of the songs I'd recorded, I had an album's worth".

In the autumn of 2005, Metronomy released a debut album, Pip Paine (Pay the £5000 You Owe) preceded by the first single 'You Could Easily Have Me'. After it had received limited attention, Mount began to build up a reputation for live shows. Initially, Metronomy was essentially a laptop/DJ act, although Mount soon asked his cousin Oscar Cash and an old schoolfriend Gabriel Stebbing to join him. Mount explained that "I was doing some shows on my own (...), which was pretty crap, so I thought it would be better to get a band thing going on".

The trio spent the next three years gaining live-experience while Mount recreated mixes for many other artists; contractual issues with the record company halted any new release. On remixing, Mount has said "(b)asically, I only like remixers that really care about what they're doing. I can honestly say that I have got really involved in all of my remixes. If I've not got anywhere with one I will tell whoever it is that I'm giving up. That doesn't happen that often." Metronomy has "a good strike rate" in terms of remix work released. However, a DFA-inspired remix of U2's "City of Blinding Lights" was dismissed by their marketing manager and was not released.

Although the band was now a three-piece live, in the studio Mount was "still writing and recording it all on my own" and "influenced by people who’ve written, recorded and produced things all on their own, like Prince". In 2008, the band released the singles "My Heart Rate Rapid", "Holiday", "Heartbreaker" (which feat. a Remix by Kris Menace), "A Thing For Me" and "Radio Ladio" and the full album Nights Out in September of that year. Kris Menace's Remix of "Heartbreaker" became Hype Chart Nr.1 in 2008. In May 2009, it was announced through the band's Myspace page that Stebbing would be leaving the band. Joseph wrote "It's all very amicable and he's assured me he doesn't think he's fleeing a sinking ship." Stebbing is currently working with his own band, Your Twenties, which is being produced by Mount. Despite this, Stebbing reappeared to play bass for Metronomy for their appearance at the Far Out stage at Green Man 2010.

In 2011, the band released three singles 'The Look', 'Everything Goes My Way' and 'The Bay' from their 3rd album The English Riviera which came out on 11 April. The album was the first to feature bassist Olugbenga Adelekan and drummer Anna Prior as band members, rounding out the band as a quartet.

On 23 January 2014, Metronomy's upcoming single Love Letters was named Zane Lowe's "Hottest Record in the World". In a telephone interview with the band, it was confirmed that the video would be directed by Michel Gondry. Their fourth studio album, Love Letters, was released on 10 March 2014, with the band achieving their joint highest ever position on the UK Albums Chart, at number 7.

In an interview with Crack Magazine, it was revealed that Metronomy would be releasing a new album in the summer of 2016. The title of the album was later revealed to be Summer 08, with its release scheduled on 1 July 2016. On 13 September 2019, Metronomy released their sixth studio album, Metronomy Forever. Their seventh studio album, Small World, was released on 18 February 2022.

Pre-Metronomy
Before Mount started writing music as Metronomy he, Gabriel and friend Kevin Hawes, who died in 2005, performed and wrote music as part of The Upsides and The Customers.

The Upsides were a band that Joseph and Gabriel joined when still in their early teens. According to Joseph they "played proper original pop songs – we like to think we were the original Busted". The band came to an end when both guys moved to Brighton to start university.

The Customers started out in 1996 as a studio project for Will and Gregg who lived in a neighbouring village to Joseph's and Gabriel's home in Devon, but did not enter its present form until all members had moved from Devon to Sussex. Will worked with Gabriel and played out live under the guise of Willis. The name changed to The Customers on Christmas Day 2001. Joseph joined the band as drummer in 2002 and they welcomed Gregg back into the line-up to complete the four piece.

Live performances

Metronomy have toured widely throughout the UK and Europe supporting acts such as Coldplay, Bloc Party, CSS, Klaxons, Kate Nash and Justice. They engaged in their first headline UK tour in 2008. Metronomy have also played gigs in America and Canada notably at the 2007 SXSW.

Up until April 2009, Joseph Mount's performance of keyboards, vocals, and guitar in the live band was accompanied by members Oscar Cash (keyboards, melodica and saxophone), and Gabriel Stebbing (keyboards and bass guitar). Since Stebbing's departure from Metronomy in 2009 their live set has been known as Metronomy 2.0 and has been highly praised by Stebbing.

Metronomy's new band features former Lightspeed Champion drummer Anna Prior and bassist Olugbenga Adelekan.

Metronomy's live shows include dance routines and light shows. Most notably they use push lights stuck to their chests. Mount explained: "We did our first gig in Brighton, and a few days before I saw these lights in a pound shop and I thought 'we'll whack these on our t-shirts and do some synchronised light shows!' I'm totally aware that some people hate it but equally I think some people enjoy it just for the fact that it's a bit of fun."

Metronomy performed at Field Day music festival in Sydney on New Year's Day 2012 and toured the UK in February 2012 with Two Door Cinema Club, Tribes and Azealia Banks on the NME Awards Tour 2012. They also performed at Primavera Sound Festival in Barcelona in May 2014, at Rock Werchter in Belgium in June 2014 and at Festival No.6 at Portmeirion, Wales in September 2015.

In June 2022, Metronomy appeared at the Glastonbury Festival.

Discography

 Pip Paine (Pay the £5000 You Owe) (2006)
 Nights Out (2008)
 The English Riviera (2011)
 Love Letters (2014)
 Summer 08 (2016)
 Metronomy Forever (2019)
 Small World (2022)

Awards and nominations
Antville Music Video Awards

|-
| 2009
| "A Thing For Me"
| Most Fun
| 
|-
| rowspan="3" | 2011
| "The Bay"
| Best Editing 
| 
|-
| "She Wants"
| Best Choreography
| 
|-
| rowspan="2" | Themselves
| rowspan="2" | Best Commissioning Artist
| 
|-
| 2014
| 

D&AD Awards

|-
|2012
|"The Bay"
|Music Video 
| style="background:#BF8040"| Wood Pencil

Mercury Prize

|-
| 2011
| The English Riviera
| Album of the Year
| 

NME Awards

|-
| 2012
| "The Bay"
| rowspan="2" | Best Dancefloor Filler
| 
|-
| 2015
| "Love Letters"
| 

Rober Awards Music Poll

|-
| 2011
| Themselves
| Best Pop Artist 
| 

UK Music Video Awards

|-
| 2009
| "A Thing For Me"
| Best Dance Video 
| 
|-
| rowspan="3" | 2011
| rowspan="3" | "The Bay"
| Best Indie/Rock Video (UK)
| 
|-
| Best Editing 
| 
|-
| Best Telecine 
| 
|-
| rowspan="6" | 2014
| Themselves 
| Best Video Artist
| 
|-
| "I'm Aquarius"
| rowspan="2" | Best Art Direction 
| 
|-
| rowspan="2" | "Love Letters"
| 
|-
| Best Pop Video (UK)
| 
|-
| rowspan="2" | "Reservoir"
| Best Animation 
| 
|-
| rowspan="2" | Best Alternative Video (UK)
| 
|-
| rowspan="2" | 2016
| rowspan="2" | "Old Skool"
| 
|-
| Best Styling 
| 
|-
| 2017
| "Hang Me Out to Dry" (ft. Robyn)
| Best Alternative Video (UK)
|

References

External links

Interview at musictowers.com
Interview at nme.com
Session for Planet Claire
Interview on remixes with Vice magazine

English electronic music groups
Musical groups from Brighton and Hove
Because Music artists